Mpouya is a locality in the Republic of the Congo. It is located near the Congo river and is nearly 215 km (135 mi) far from the Congo's capital city, Brazzaville. Part of the Batéké Plateau runs through in Mpouya.

References

External links 
 Contract: Lot 4 - Rehabilitation Works on Road NGO-Mpouya (58 km). The World Bank. January 20, 2004.

Geography of the Republic of the Congo